Kyzyl-Tash (Kızıl-Taş) is a rural locality (a selo) in Kurayskoye Rural Settlement of Kosh-Agachsky District, the Altai Republic, Russia. The population was 785 as of 2016. There are 7 streets.

Geography 
Kyzyl-Tash is located 69 km northwest of Kosh-Agach (the district's administrative centre) by road. Kuray is the nearest rural locality.

References 

Rural localities in Kosh-Agachsky District